The Port Curtis colonial by-election, 1866 was a by-election held on 19 March 1866 in the electoral district of Port Curtis for the Queensland Legislative Assembly.

History
On 1 February 1866, John Douglas, the member for Port Curtis, was appointed as a minister. As such, he was required to resign and contest a ministerial by-election for his own seat. On 19 March 1866, he lost the by-election to Arthur Hunter Palmer.

See also
 Members of the Queensland Legislative Assembly, 1863–1867

References

1866 elections in Australia
Queensland state by-elections
1860s in Queensland